Lucas and Marcus Dobre-Mofid (born January 28, 1999), collectively known as the Dobre Twins, are an American dancing duo and YouTube personalities who rose to prominence on the now-defunct video application Vine. They are part of the Dobre Brothers, where they are joined by their older brothers, Cyrus and Darius.

The Dobre Brothers produce video content. Their content includes challenge videos, experiments, vlogs, dance videos, pranks and lots of other content.

The twins run their eponymous YouTube channel Lucas and Marcus while the brothers feature collectively on "Dobre Brothers" and "Dobre Cars".

Personal life 
The twins were born in Maryland to retired Olympic gymnast Aurelia Dobre and Boz Mofid, the owners of Dobre Gymnastics Academy in Gaithersburg, Maryland. They have two older brothers, Cyrus Dobre (born 1993) and Darius Dobre (born 1995).

Career 
Lucas and Marcus were known as "TwinBotz", they first gained fame on the six-second video application Vine, where they had more than 1.8 million followers before it shut down. The twins used the app to showcase their talent, including breakdancing and gymnastics stunts, such as backflips. Their popularity helped them earn a spot at AT&T's Later Haters expo.

In March 2018, it was announced that the Dobre Brothers have signed a joint venture deal with Creative Artists Agency (CAA).

In August of 2022, a Youtube short video on their channel titled "Revenge"  in which Marcus pranks Lucas and his girlfriend Ivanita Lormeli by cutting a hole in an air mattress in a pool that they were sleeping in surpassed YouTube Rewind 2018: Everyone Controls Rewind as the most-disliked YouTube video, at 51 million dislikes.

Controversy 
In January 2022, The Dobre Brothers were criticized by viewers and the suicide prevention charity Suicide Awareness voices of Education after uploading a video titled "MY TWIN BROTHER IS DEAD?!" in which Marcus faked a death by suicide as a prank. The Dobre Brothers have not responded to the controversy and the video remains up on their YouTube channel as of January 2023.

Awards and nominations

References

External links
Lucas and Marcus's channel on YouTube
Dobre Brothers channel on YouTube

Living people
1999 births
American YouTubers
American breakdancers
People from Gaithersburg, Maryland
American identical twin children
YouTube channels
American TikTokers
Fullscreen (company) people
American people of Iranian descent
American people of Romanian descent
People with speech impediment
Identical twin males
Dancers from Maryland
YouTube controversies